= Zuzana Štefániová =

Female printer

Zuzana Štefániová (14 January 1788 – after 1829) was the first female printer in Slovakia. She was the daughter of Stefan Wester and married Ján Štefáni, owner of the oldest and, at the time, the only printing shop in Slovakia. She inherited the printing shop in 1822, and managed it for seven years. Her activities after 1829 are unknown.
